Bera Ivanishvili (born 23 December 1994), also known as simply Bera, is a Georgian singer, rapper, songwriter, record producer, and entrepreneur. Bera established his music career in both Georgia and the United States, and is additionally the founder of the Georgian record label and production studio Georgian Dream.

Early life
Ivanishvili was born in Paris on 23 December 1994 to Georgian parents Bidzina Ivanishvili and Ekaterine Khvedelidze. His family returned to Georgia after his birth, settling in Tbilisi. Ivanishvili is the second of four children; his siblings include brothers Uta and Tsotne, and sister Gvantsa. He was born with the condition albinism; Ivanishvili's brother Tsotne also has the condition.

Career
Ivanishvili began experimenting with music as a child, and was classically trained. By age four, he could play piano, drums, and the violin. Ivanishvili went on to begin his music career officially in 2010, working with producers such as Rodney Jerkins, and later released his debut single "My Favourite Things" in 2011. Later in 2011, Ivanishvili founded the record label and music studio Georgian Dream Studio, where he worked with other Georgian musicians such as Nina Sublatti. The name went on to become influential in Georgian society, with his father Bidzina Ivanishvili launching his political party of the same name around the same time. Bera released the single "Georgian Dream" in support of his father's political aspirations. In 2012, Ivanishvili released his debut studio album Gpirdepi. In 2018, Ivanishvili received widespread attention after releasing the single "Legalize". The song sought to protest the restrictive drug laws passed by the Parliament of Georgia, and stand in solidarity with protesters demonstrating against the violent anti-drug raids by police forces at nightclubs such as Bassiani.

Bera collaborated with Kiff No Beat on their song "Ne Change Rien", Patoranking on "Fire to the Sun" and "Wilmer".

Personal life
Ivanishvili married Georgian model and fashion blogger Nanuka Gudavadze in November 2018 in an Orthodox service at Svetitskhoveli Cathedral in Mtskheta, after having dated for several months and gotten engaged that September. The guests were asked to send a donation to local foster home organizations instead of buying gifts. In April 2019, they confirmed that Gudavadze was pregnant with their first child, which was later confirmed to be a boy the following month. Their son was born in November 2019.

Controversy 
As the son of Georgia's richest man, phone recording leaks revealed that Bera Ivanishvili was using high-level government officials to track and terrorize people who criticized him and his music on social media, including minors.          Prime Minister Irakli Garibashvili, who is a close confident of Bera's father, is heard encouraging the retributions on the covertly recorded tapes. Ivanishvili and the ruling party have offered contradicting positions on the leaks, with some arguing the authenticity and that the recordings were doctored, while some have noted that the recordings were from 2010 - the period when Bera was himself a minor and his father's ruling party was yet to take formal power in the country.

Discography

Albums

Singles

References

External links

1994 births
21st-century male singers from Georgia (country)
English-language singers from Georgia (country)
Expatriates from Georgia (country) in France
Expatriates from Georgia (country) in the United States
Living people
Musicians from Tbilisi
People with albinism
Pop singers from Georgia (country)
Rappers from Georgia (country)
Record producers from Georgia (country)
Singers from Paris
21st-century French male singers